Litera may refer to:
Litera (company), American software company
La Litera, comarca (administrative division) in Huesca, Aragon, Spain
Ivan Litera (born 1976), Serbian footballer

See also